Jan Blaha (12 March 1938 in Brno - 13 December 2012 in Brno) was a Czech clandestine Roman Catholic bishop. After the Velvet Revolution he no longer ministered as a bishop.  

Ordained to the priesthood on 12 July 1967, Blaha was secretly ordained a bishop on 28 October 1967 because of the Communist Government of Czechoslovakia and the persecution of the Roman Catholic Church by the government. He secretly ordained as a bishop Felix Maria Davídek, who was his teacher in the clandestine Church.

Notes

1938 births
2012 deaths
Roman Catholic bishops in Czechoslovakia
Czech Roman Catholic bishops
Clergy from Brno
Burials at Brno Central Cemetery